Jaime Fernandez may refer to:
Jaime Fernández (actor) (1927–2005), Mexican actor
Jaime Fernández (basketball) (born 1993), Spanish basketball player
Jaime Fernández (handballer) (born 1997), Spanish handball player
Jaime Fernandez (rower) (born 1971), Australian rower
Jaime Fernández (swimmer) (born 1968), Spanish swimmer